Bominaco  is a frazione of Caporciano in the province of L'Aquila in the Abruzzo region of southern Italy.

Main sights
 Castle of Bominaco
 Oratory of San Pellegrino
 Santa Maria Assunta church

 
Frazioni of the Province of L'Aquila